The Right Hegelians, Old Hegelians (Althegelianer), or the Hegelian Right (die Hegelsche Rechte), were those followers of German philosopher Georg Wilhelm Friedrich Hegel in the early 19th century who took his philosophy in a politically and religiously conservative direction.  They are typically contrasted with the Young Hegelians (Hegelian Left), who interpreted Hegel's political philosophy as supportive of left-wing and progressive politics or religion.

Overview
Hegel's historicism holds that both ideas and institutions can only be understood by understanding their history.  Throughout his life, Hegel said he was an orthodox Lutheran. He devoted considerable attention to the Absolute, his term for the infinite Spirit responsible for the totality of reality—something like God, though not the God of classical theism. This Spirit comes to fullest expression in the historical reality of the modern state. In his Philosophy of Right, Hegel writes that:

The Hegelian right expanded this conception of statism, seizing on it as an affirmation of establishment politics and orthodox religion.  Hegel's historicism could be read to affirm the historical inevitability of modern institutions; a nation was an Ideal, existing in Hegelian idealism above and about the people who constituted it.  To argue for political change was to attack the Ideal of the national state.  The Right Hegelians believed that advanced European societies, as they existed in the first half of the nineteenth century, were the summit of all social development, the product of the historical dialectic that had existed thus far.  Most praised the Prussian state, which enjoyed an extensive civil service system, good universities, industrialization, and high employment, as the acme of progress and the incarnation of the Zeitgeist.

Many of the members of the Hegelian right went on to have distinguished careers in public academia or the Lutheran Church.  As a school, they were closely associated with the University of Berlin, and held many of the chairs of philosophy and theology there.  Generally, the philosophers of the Hegelian right have been neglected; their fame, if not their reputations, has been eclipsed by the Young Hegelians, including Bruno Bauer and Karl Marx. They left their mark chiefly in theology.  Their efforts did not have the intended effect of bolstering a sense of the inevitability of faith as a product of history; rather, they pioneered the introduction of higher criticism by demonstrating the influence of an era on the development of Christianity. Other members of the Hegelian Right included the Erlangen School of Neo-Lutherans, whose influence continues to the present day in confessional Lutheranism.

Recent studies have questioned the paradigm of Left- and Right-Hegelianism.  No Hegelians of the period ever referred to themselves as "Right Hegelians", which was a term of insult originated by David Strauss, a self-styled Left Hegelian. Critiques of Hegel offered by the Left Hegelians radically diverted Hegel's thinking into new directions and eventually came to form a large part of the literature on and about Hegel.

Speculative theism
Speculative theism was an 1830s movement closely related to but distinguished from Right Hegelianism. Its proponents (Immanuel Hermann Fichte, Christian Hermann Weisse, Hermann Ulrici) were united in their demand to recover the "personal God" after panlogist Hegelianism. The movement featured elements of anti-psychologism in the historiography of philosophy.

People

Philosophers within the camp of the Hegelian right include:

 Johann Philipp Gabler
 Hermann Friedrich Wilhelm Hinrichs
 Karl Daub
 Heinrich Leo
 Leopold von Henning
 Heinrich Gustav Hotho

Other thinkers or historians who may be included among the Hegelian right, with some reservations, include:

 Johann Karl Friedrich Rosenkranz
 Eduard Gans
 Karl Ludwig Michelet
 Philip Marheineke
 Wilhelm Vatke
 Johann Eduard Erdmann
 Eduard Zeller
 Albert Schwegler
 Hans Lassen Martensen

Hegelian theologians

Rationalistic
 Karl Daub
 Philip Marheineke
 David Strauss
 Ferdinand Christian Baur
 Richard Adelbert Lipsius
 Otto Pfleiderer

Erlangen school
 G. C. A. von Harless
 J. W. F. Höfling
 Gottfried Thomasius
 J. C. K. von Hofmann
 Franz Delitzsch
 K. F. A. Kahnis
 Theodosius Harnack
 C. E. Luthardt
 F. H. R. von Frank
 Paul Althaus
 Werner Elert

See also
 Ritter School

References

External links
 Hegelianismus – cpw-online.de

Georg Wilhelm Friedrich Hegel
Hegelianism